André Alonzo Forster Paras (born November 1, 1995) is a Filipino actor, model, dancer, singer, and former professional basketball player. He is the son of former PBA player Benjie Paras and brother of Kobe Paras. He is the best known for his role as Chad Jimenez in the film adaptation of Diary ng Panget. Paras is most seen in GMA Network and most known for playing the role of Bradley Castillo in the hit melodrama The Half Sisters. After the success of The Half Sisters, Paras and Barbie Forteza paired again in That's My Amboy which aired on 2016.

Early life and career
Paras was born on November 1, 1995 in Los Angeles to a PBA legend Benjie Paras and former actress Jackie Forster. He also has a younger brother, Kobe, a basketball player who plays for the Altiri Chiba in the Japanese B.League.

Paras played for La Salle Greenhills in high school. In college, he played for the University of the Philippines (UP) Fighting Maroons like his father. In 2014, Paras transferred from University of the Philippines to San Beda College with the intention of playing for the San Beda Red Lions. After a year of studying in UP and playing as a rookie for the UP Fighting Maroons, he opted to transfer for not being able to balance his studies and acting career due to his hectic work schedule in his drama series The Half Sisters. He also said that although it was his dream to study in UP, he didn't want to have a bad reputation in the university.

Paras then pursued an acting career.

Professional career

Imus Bandera (2018–2019) 
Paras played for the Imus Bandera for the 2018–2019 season of MPBL.

Blackwater Bossing (2021–2022)
Paras selected 27th overall pick at the PBA Season 46 draft. Before the start of the 47th PBA season, he took a leave of absence from Blackwater to pursue acting.

Career statistics

PBA 

|-
| align="left" | 
| align="left" | Blackwater
| 19 || 9.4 || .526 || .083 || — || 1.5 || .2 || .0 || .3 || 2.2
|-class=sortbottom
| align="center" colspan=2 | Career
| 19 || 9.4 || .526 || .083 || — || 1.5 || .2 || .0 || .3 || 2.2

College

Showbiz career

GMA Network
Paras debut series became one of his biggest breaks when he appeared in the fantasy-drama series Elena M. Patron's Blusang Itim in a supporting role. He became a GMA Network contract artist in 2011 and a regular performer in Sunday All Stars.

In 2022, Paras resumed his showbiz career with an appearance on the drama-fantasy show, Daig Kayo ng Lola Ko. He also joined the broadcast panel for NCAA Season 98.

VIVA Films 
In 2014, together with co-stars Nadine Lustre, James Reid and Yassi Pressman, Paras starred as Chad Jimenez in the Diary ng Panget, a 2014 Filipino teen romantic comedy film based on the popular best-selling book of the same name written and published on Wattpad by Denny R.

Filmography

Film

Television

TV dramas

Variety shows

Reality show

Game show

Awards and nominations

References

External links

 

 https://www.gmanetwork.com/sparkle/artists/andreparas

1995 births
Living people
Filipino men's basketball players
Filipino male child actors
Filipino male film actors
Filipino male dancers
Filipino male television actors
VJs (media personalities)
Filipino television variety show hosts
GMA Network personalities
Viva Artists Agency
Basketball players from Quezon City
UP Fighting Maroons basketball players
Centers (basketball)
American sportspeople of Filipino descent
Maharlika Pilipinas Basketball League players
Blackwater Bossing draft picks
Power forwards (basketball)
Blackwater Bossing players
American men's basketball players
Citizens of the Philippines through descent